Last Winter is the debut studio album by American rapper Bas. It was released on April 29, 2014, by Dreamville Records, and Interscope Records. The album debuted at No. 103 on Billboard 200, selling 3,601 copies in its first week. It  has sold 11,000 copies in the US as of February 2016.

Background
The album features guest appearances from his label-mates J. Cole, and KQuick, along with artists contributing this album such as Irvin Washington, and Mack Wilds. The production on this album includes from Cedric Brown, Ron Gilmore, GP808, Hottrak, Jay Kurzweil, and Ogee Handz, among others.

Singles and promotion
On May 2, Bas released the music video for "My Nigga Just Made Bail" featuring J. Cole. The song "Lit" appeared on his mixtape in 2013, and a music video for that was released on July 11, followed by a video for "Charles De Gaulle to JFK".

Track listing
Credits adapted from ASCAP.

Sample Credits

 "New World Order" contains a sample of "Demise" written and performed by Georgia Anne Muldrow.
 "Vacation" contains a sample of "Flashback" written by Adam Wiles and performed by Calvin Harris.
 "Donk of the Day" contains a sample of "You Are the Heart of Me" written by Eddie Holland and Michael Smith and performed by The Supremes.
 "Golden Goals" contains a sample of "This Time" written by Myron Avant, Stephen Huff, Chris Kelly and Eric Payton and performed by Avant.
 "Last Winter" contains a sample of "Who Can I Run To?" written by Frank Alstin and Charles Simmons and performed by The Jones Girls.
 "Lit" contains a sample of "Do You..." written by Miguel Pimantel, Arden Altino, Jerry Duplessis and Paul Pesco and performed by Miguel.

Notes
 indicated a co-producer.

Charts

References

2014 debut albums
Interscope Records albums
Interscope Geffen A&M Records albums
Albums produced by J. Cole
Dreamville Records albums